Vladimir Vyacheslavovich Shurochkin  (born 12 April 1966) is a Russian singer, musician,  one of the former lead singers of Laskovyi Mai (1989—1990). Father and producer of pop star Nyusha and competitor in synchronized swimming Maria Shurochkina.

He was born in Moscow.

References

External links
 Laskovyi Mai 
 Официальный сайт Нюши
 Владимир Шурочкин —  Ласковый май
 Владимир Шурочкин —  Губы в губы
 Владимир Шурочкин —  Летний ливень

1966 births
Living people
Singers from Moscow
Russian record producers
Soviet male singers
Soviet pop singers
Russian pop singers
Soviet composers
Soviet male composers
Russian composers
Russian male composers
20th-century Russian male singers
20th-century Russian singers